Harry Robert Charles Came (born 27 August 1998) is an English cricketer who currently plays for Derbyshire. 

He made his first-class debut on 20 August 2019, for Hampshire in the 2019 County Championship, as a concussion replacement for Aneurin Donald. Came was released by Hampshire ahead of the 2021 County Championship.

On 8 June 2021, Came signed for Derbyshire until the end of the 2023 season. He made his Twenty20 debut on 11 June 2021, for Derbyshire in the 2021 T20 Blast. He made his List A debut on 22 July 2021, for Derbyshire in the 2021 Royal London One-Day Cup.

References

External links
 

1998 births
Living people
Cricketers from Basingstoke
Derbyshire cricketers
English cricketers of the 21st century
English cricketers
Hampshire cricketers